New Foundation may refer to:
 The New Foundation (professional wrestling), a tag team consisting of Owen Hart and Jim Neidhart
 New Foundations, an axiomatic set theory
 New Foundation Association, a Korean independence movement during the Japanese colonial period
 New Foundation Fellowship, a Christian Quaker ministry
 the New Foundation development in the Church of England; see Historical development of Church of England dioceses